Whiteadder Water  is a river in East Lothian and Berwickshire, Scotland. It also flows for a very short distance through Northumberland before joining the River Tweed.

Etymology
Adder may be derived from Brittonic *ador, *edir or Old English edre, possible ancient hydronymic terms derived from an Indo-European formation meaning "a watercourse, a channel" (compare River Etherow). The possibility of the name deriving from Old English ǣdre, "a vein" (Anglian ēdre), or *ǣdre, meaning "quickly" is objected on the grounds that these would have maintained the long initial vowel in English and Scots.

Also suggested is derivation from Gaelic fad dûr, meaning "long water". though the Gaelic was never spoked in the Scottish southeast.

Course
The stream wends its way south east for approximately  where it joins with the Faseny Water to form the Whiteadder Reservoir created in 1968, which supplies most of the towns of East Lothian (including, before its closure, the Cockenzie power station) and Berwickshire, with water.

From there, crossing into Berwickshire it runs alongside the B6355 road to Ellemford where it joins the Dye Water and further on at Abbey St. Bathans, the Monynut Water.

By this point having become a much larger body of flow, the Whiteadder meanders across Eastern parts of the Merse passing the communities of Preston, Chirnside, Allanton. Here at Allanton the Whiteadder joins with its antonymic counterpart the Blackadder Water. The river proceeds by Foulden, Edrington, and Paxton, it crosses into England, before joining the River Tweed, just north of East Ord, a suburb of Berwick-upon-Tweed.

Notability
For those with fishing permits, the Whiteadder provides recreational salmon and trout fishing. There are a number of angling clubs offering affordable access to this lovely river including the Whiteadder Angling Association (trout) and Berwick and District Angling Association (salmon, sea trout and wild brown trout). The Whiteadder is the home of the oldest Angling Club in the world verified by the Guinness Book of Records, Ellem Angling Club, established in 1829. Membership is by invitation only. The regalia of the club is on display at Paxton House in Berwickshire. It is also the site of Ninewells, the childhood home of David Hume.

The lowermost section of the Whiteadder is a Site of Special Scientific Interest (SSSI) by virtue of its water crowfoot, salmon, lamprey and moulting mute swan.

See also
 Rivers of Scotland
 List of places in the Scottish Borders

References

Rivers of the Scottish Borders
Rivers of East Lothian
Rivers of Northumberland
Sites of Special Scientific Interest in Berwickshire and Roxburgh
Tributaries of the River Tweed
Environment of East Lothian
Environment of Berwickshire
1Whiteadder